A by-election was held for the New South Wales Legislative Assembly electorate of Argyle on 30 October 1862 because the seat of Terence Murray was declared vacant due to his appointment as President of the Legislative Council.

Dates

Results

Terence Murray was appointed President of the Legislative Council.

See also
Electoral results for the district of Argyle
List of New South Wales state by-elections

References

1862 elections in Australia
New South Wales state by-elections
1860s in New South Wales